Mental (typographically stylized MƎNTAL:) is a television series produced by Fox's subsidiary Fox Telecolombia, which aired in the summer and fall of 2009 on FOX international channels for Latin America, Europe and Asia, starring Chris Vance and Annabella Sciorra. Mental was executive-produced by Deborah Joy LeVine – creator of the successful drama series Lois & Clark: The New Adventures of Superman and the Lifetime series The Division, and executive producer of Any Day Now, Dawson's Creek and the CBS series Early Edition – and her brother and writing/producing partner, Dan LeVine.  Following its U.S. debut, it aired in 35 additional countries. Fox Latin America aired the first episode as a "Worldwide Premiere" on June 2, 2009. Fox aired the pilot episode on May 26, 2009, for the American market. Fox TV Studios ordered 13 episodes. It began production on June 2, 2008, at the Fox Telecolombia production facilities in Bogotá.

Although the series was filmed in the city of Bogotá in Colombia representing Los Angeles (United States), no Colombian actor was cast as a regular character and very few were cast for occasional roles, because of the strict American nature of the series. According to TVWeek, Jacqueline McKenzie, Derek Webster, Nicholas Gonzalez, and Marisa Ramirez were added to the cast of Mental, "probably as recurrent characters."

Due to declining ratings, Fox cancelled the show following its first season.

Characters

Main cast 
 Dr. Jack Gallagher (Chris Vance)
 The protagonist of the show, Jack is an Australian man living in America, for what seems like much of his life as his stepfather of many years is American. He uses rather unorthodox methods to get inside the patient's head to help cure them; however, this usually gains him spite from his fellow doctors. He enjoys riding his bike and has a mentally unstable sister whom he is trying to find, and has been for four years. At the end of the episode "Do Over," he finds Becky, and she is placed in the hospital, diagnosed with schizophrenia. Jack's mother and stepfather come and try to convince him to let them take Becky to Florida for treatment. Jack is skeptical, but Becky decides to leave with her parents. In the season finale, Jack is seen talking to an anonymous therapist (who turns out to be himself), and he admits that he has an irrational fear of developing schizophrenia, which is why he is afraid of commitment. It is also revealed that he, most likely, is dealing with clinical depression at this point. In the final scene, he punches Carl and is subsequently fired. Jack then leaves; the season, as well as the series, ends.  The last shot of the series shows us Dr. Gallagher now vagrant and without direction, in opposition to his recently vagrant sister, who has chosen to return home with her family.  The season ends in direct opposition to the season opening.

 Nora Skoff (Annabella Sciorra)
 She is a hospital administrator who shares a romantic past with Dr. Gallagher. Nora has a distinctive and conservative style. She successfully battled cancer and is divorced with two daughters.

 Dr. Carl Belle (Derek Webster)
 Dr. Belle is a master politician who is dedicated to Jack's downfall, even secretly black-mailing Arturo to spy on Jack.

 Dr. Veronica Hayden-Jones (Jacqueline McKenzie)
 Dr. Hayden-Jones is a dedicated psychiatrist who is upset that she wasn't given Jack's job. She is married to a musician, but was cheating on him with one of the doctors in the hospital.  This doctor has subsequently resigned.

 Dr. Chloë Artis (Marisa Ramirez)
 Dr. Artis is a gorgeous doctor who is passing the time in a residency she feels is beneath her until Jack opens her mind to the inspirational benefits of psychiatry. She is frequently pursued by Arturo before she reveals to him that she is a lesbian.

 Dr. Arturo Suarez (Nicholas Gonzalez)
 Dr. Suarez is a first-year resident. He is young and cocky, constantly looking for love (or sex), and won't seem to give up on Chloe, even knowing her sexual orientation. Arturo falsified his transcripts so that he could become a doctor and that information is being held against him by Carl, who is blackmailing Arturo into spying on Jack.

Recurring cast 

Margo Stroud (Samantha Eggar)
Jack and Becky's mother, whose first husband and the father of her children, died. She is now living in Florida and is married to James.

James Stroud (Madison Mason)
Jack and Becky's step-father and Margo's second husband. James is a retired Navy Vice Admiral - Jack even bitterly states that James raised them as though they were soldiers. Jack holds a grudge on James for sticking Becky in the first institution he could find, twenty years ago, when Becky was diagnosed with schizophrenia. He is American.

Becky Gallagher (Amanda Douge)
Becky is Jack's twin sister, who was diagnosed with schizophrenia twenty years ago. She has been missing for four years, and showed up on Jack's doorstep near the end of the first season. Jack is very protective over her and they both share a strong loving bond. She is frequently haunted by hallucinations of a young man named Gabe.

Special guests 

The series features performances by actors from the United States or other countries who have traveled to Bogotá, Colombia, to film the episode where they have their respective appearance in the next table special performances that stand out:

Episodes

Critical response 
 
Metacritic gave season 1 a score of 40% based on reviews by 18 critics.

Ratings 
The series premiere of Mental on FOX improved on its lead-in and averaged a 3.6/6, to go with just under 5.8 million viewers.

U.S. ratings

Canadian ratings

DVD Releases
A DVD of the complete series titled Mental - The Complete 1st Season was announced on September 2, 2009. The DVD was released on December 1, 2009. The DVD includes all 13 episodes on a 4-disc set, plus an unrated alternate pilot.

References

External links 
  Mental Official Site at FOX.com
 

Fox Broadcasting Company original programming
2009 American television series debuts
2000s American drama television series
2009 American television series endings
Television shows set in Los Angeles
Colombian drama television series
2000s American medical television series
Television series by 20th Century Fox Television
Television series produced by Fox Telecolombia